Richard Andrew (born February 17, 1983), better known by his stage name Outasight, is an American singer-songwriter, rapper, and record producer born and raised in Yonkers, New York. Though he is considered a pop artist, he is influenced by other genres such as hip hop, rock music and soul music.

His debut album, "Nights Like These" (2012), featured the platinum-selling "Tonight Is The Night". He spent the next few years on the road performing at festivals such as Lollapalooza, Governors Ball, and Vans Warped Tour. His follow up album, Big Trouble, was released in October 2015, which produced the singles "The Wild Life" and "The Boogie". On August 18, 2017, He released his third studio album "Richie", With his fourth studio album, "Future Vintage Soul", coming on October 19, 2018.

Biography

Richard Andrew was born in Yonkers, New York on February 17, 1983. At the age of 9, his father gave him a guitar, it sparked his interest in becoming a musician. He began writing rhymes and singing around age 10. He attended St. Joseph's School in Bronxville, NY.

Early career
Outasight began playing shows at small venues in New York City such as the Bowery Poetry Club and the Nuyorican Cafe. After his first EP release Employee of the Year, he played at the 2007 Hip-hop festival alongside major label acts such as Ghostface Killah, Skillz, and Consequence. In June 2008, Outasight released his second promotional CD, titled Radio New York. This release saw more commercial success, and was featured in XXL Magazine's Soundcheck choice in "Something to Talk About." His music video for the song "Good Evening (Dream Big)" received a video rotation spot on mtvU in the Fall of 2008, after winning the 2008 mtvU Freshmen video contest. "Good Evening" was also popularized by its use in Ray William Johnson's YouTube-based vlog series: Breaking NYC.

2009–13: Nights Like These
In October 2009, Outasight signed with Warner Bros. Records. In December 2009, Lifted Research Group, better known as LRG, sponsored the release of Outasight's Further mixtape. His biggest release to date, Further has generated even more press than the previous two albums. The album was heavily publicized on the internet, garnering strong reviews and also promotion from YouTube celebrity Ray William Johnson. Since then, he has been featured in major media outlets, such as MTV News. On March 23, 2010, Outasight released the Further EP on Asylum Records, and on November 23, 2012, he released his first full-length studio album, Nights Like These. Outasight released a music video for his single "Catch Me If You Can" from the Further EP, which has been featured on numerous hip-hop blogs. Also in 2010, Outasight collaborated with rapper Asher Roth on the "Catch Me If You Can" remix.

Outasight released his first single, "Tonight Is the Night", which was featured on a Pepsi commercial. </ref> The commercial includes footage of Michael Jackson, Britney Spears, Mariah Carey, Ray Charles, and Kanye West. Tonight Is The Night was the theme for the 1000th episode of WWE Monday Night RAW.

Outasight performed live at the 2012 NHL All-Star Game in Ottawa, Ontario, where his single "Tonight Is the Night" was the song for the player introductions. On January 17, 2012, Outasight performed his song "Tonight Is the Night" on Late Night with Jimmy Fallon with The Roots. On April 13, 2012, Outasight confirmed via Facebook that his second single from his upcoming debut album would be called "Now or Never" and that would be out soon. It was released on May 11, 2012. His debut album, Nights Like These was released on November 23, 2012, and it peaked at No. 13 on the Heatseekers Albums chart.

2014–17: Big Trouble and Richie
In 2015, he launched a recording label named RPM MSC in partnership with his management. Outasight's sophomore studio album, Big Trouble, was released on October 23, 2015, through RPM MSC. Its lead single "The Wild Life" was released on July 29, 2015 and featured in the Bud Light Lime & Mountain Dew summer campaigns and several films. His next single, "The "Boogie"  was selected to be in the "Apple Watch 2" campaign, the opening introduction to the NBA Primetime on ABC, and also the credit song to the box office blockbuster, Central Intelligence.

His next single, "Do Something Crazy", was released late summer of 2016.  The song was featured in the film (Mike and Dave Need Wedding Dates) along with (The Nut Job 2: Nutty By Nature) and the soundtrack to the video game, Madden 17.

Outasight released is first single of 2017 on April 7 with "I Got You" and announced his third album was coming in the summer.
 4 days later, the music video for "I Got You" was released. On June 9, Outsight released the single "Life of the Party" as part of a Summer of new music for him. The music video for Life of the Party was released on June 30. A week later he dropped his next single "Feel Good" which features Hoodie Allen.

2018–present: Future Vintage Soul
On July 20, 2018, Outasight released the single "Never Get Enough". On August 14, 2018, he announced his fourth studio album, Future Vintage Soul, with a scheduled release date of October 19, 2018. On October 4, he released another new song, titled "Higher". "Higher" was a part of the Forza Horizon 4 Soundtrack. "The Bounce" was revealed to be the theme song for Google Assistant on October 10.

In 2019, Outasight started his record label 83 Sound, partnering with longtime producer Cook Classics.  

In 2021, he released his 5th Studio album Jamz.  The album singles "All Time Fave" and "Clap Your Hands" were used as the intro to the Stanley Cup Finals.

Discography

Studio albums
 Nights Like These (2012)
 Big Trouble (2015)
 Richie (2017)
 Future Vintage Soul (2018)
Jamz (2021)

EPs
2010: Further EP (Asylum)

2019: No Vacancy EP

Mixtapes
2007: Employee of the Year EP
2008: Radio New York
2009: From There to Here
2009: Further
2010: Never Say Never
2011: Figure 8 EP
2011: Get It Together
2013: Stay Gold

Singles

Videography
"Catch Me If You Can" 
"Losing My Mind" 
"It's Like That" 
"So What" 
"Figure 8" 
"Tonight is the Night" 
"Now or Never" 
"Shine" 
 "Tapedeck Blues" 
 "Anchor Down" 
 "The Wild Life" 
 "The Boogie" 
 "I Got You" 
 "Life of the Party"

Songwriter
Jacob Banks "Part Time Love"
Max Frost "Adderrall"
Hoodie Allen "Believe"
Hoodie Allen "Ain't Ready"

References

External links
Official website
MySpace
LastFM

1983 births
Living people
21st-century American male musicians
21st-century American rappers
21st-century American singers
Alternative hip hop musicians
American hip hop singers
American male rappers
American male singers
People from Yonkers, New York
Rappers from New York City
Singers from New York City